Viscount  was a politician and cabinet minister in the pre-war Empire of Japan.

Biography
Toshisada Maeda was born in Tokyo, as the eldest son of Maeda Toshiaki, the final daimyō of Nanokaichi Domain in Kōzuke Province, and inherited his father’s kazoku peerage title of shishaku (viscount). His brother, Toshinari, was a general in the Imperial Japanese Army

Toshisada Maeda was a graduate of Tokyo Imperial University. He served briefly in the infantry during the First Sino-Japanese War in 1894, and afterwards assumed his family’s seat in the House of Peers of the Diet of Japan. In 1922, he was appointed Communications Minister in the cabinet of Prime Minister Katō Tomosaburō. He subsequently served in the cabinet of Prime Minister Kiyoura Keigo as Minister of Agriculture and Commerce. He retired from public life in January 1944, and died in October of the same year. He was posthumously awarded the Order of the Sacred Treasures, 1st class. 

Maeda studied poetry under Sasaki Nobutsuna. His daughter married post-war Foreign Minister Katsuo Okazaki.

Family tree 

 
 

1874 births
1944 deaths
University of Tokyo alumni
Kazoku
Members of the House of Peers (Japan)
Maeda clan
Government ministers of Japan
Recipients of the Order of the Sacred Treasure